An annular solar eclipse occurred on January 22, 1879. A solar eclipse occurs when the Moon passes between Earth and the Sun, thereby totally or partly obscuring the image of the Sun for a viewer on Earth. An annular solar eclipse occurs when the Moon's apparent diameter is smaller than the Sun's, blocking most of the Sun's light and causing the Sun to look like an annulus (ring). An annular eclipse appears as a partial eclipse over a region of the Earth thousands of kilometers wide.
The path of totality crossed southern Africa.

Observations 
On 22 January 1879, approximately 1,700 British soldiers and over 1,000 Zulu warriors were killed during the Zulu War in South Africa. At 2:29 PM there was a solar eclipse, and according to legend, this motivated the Zulus, who claimed that it was a sign that they would prevail. The conflict was named the Battle of Isandlwana, the Zulu name for the battle translates as "the day of the dead moon".

Notes

References
 NASA graphic
 Googlemap
 NASA Besselian elements

1879 1 22
1879 in science
1879 1 22
January 1879 events